William Harlan Haas (born May 24, 1982) is an American professional golfer who plays on the PGA Tour and won the 2011 FedEx Cup. He is the son of former PGA Tour player Jay Haas.

Early life
Haas was born in Charlotte, North Carolina, and was raised in Greer, South Carolina, a suburb of Greenville. He was the third member of his family to play golf at Wake Forest University in Winston-Salem, North Carolina, following his father, Jay, and uncle, Jerry.

College career
Haas had a distinguished college career - he was a three-time first-team All-American, four-time All-ACC, two-time ACC player-of-the-year, and 2001 ACC rookie-of-the-year. During his college career, he won ten college tournaments, and in his senior year of 2004, he won the Haskins Award, the Jack Nicklaus Award, and the Ben Hogan Award. He also set an NCAA record for lowest scoring average. Haas was a member of the 2003 Walker Cup team as well as two Palmer Cup teams. He turned professional in 2004.

Professional career
Haas was a member of the Nationwide Tour (now Web.com Tour) in 2005 after failing to earn his PGA Tour card in qualifying school. His best finish in a Nationwide Tour event was a solo second at the 2005 Scholarship America Showdown. At the end of the season Haas birdied the last two holes at the 2005 qualifying tournament to earn his card on the PGA Tour for the 2006 season.

In his debut year on tour, Haas finished 99th on the money list, making 19 out of 30 cuts. His best result was at the Wachovia Championship where he finished in a tie for fourth. He kept his tour card for the 2007 season, but he missed eight cuts in his first 13 events. He started to turn his form around during the fall series and recorded his best finish of the year at the Viking Classic with a tie for third place. He ended the year 104th on the money list.

In 2008 Haas had a remarkably similar year to 2007, finishing 104th on the money list for the second year in a row. He qualified for the first two FedEx Cup playoffs events before being eliminated at the halfway stage, finishing 73rd in the standings. Haas also played well at the Viking Classic for the second year running with a T-4 finish. Haas enjoyed much greater success in 2009 with four top-10 finishes including a tie for third at the Valero Texas Open. This set him up for a good run into the playoffs and for first time in his career, Haas qualified for the third playoff event, the BMW Championship before falling short of the top 30 mark and ending the season 41st in the standings. He also finished 61st on the year-end money list, winning just under $1.5 million.

At the start of the 2010 season Haas won his first PGA Tour title at the Bob Hope Classic in La Quinta, California. A week prior to the event, Haas received advice from his father, Jay, and great-uncle Bob Goalby about his foot positioning during his swing. Haas won the event by one shot over Matt Kuchar, Tim Clark and Bubba Watson. The win came at the start of his fifth year on the PGA Tour.

With his first win Haas earned his first appearance in the Masters Tournament, where he finished in a tie for 26th. In the fall he won his second PGA Tour title of 2010 and of his career, in October at the Viking Classic, winning by three strokes over Michael Allen. The following week he finished runner-up at the McGladrey Classic to Heath Slocum by one stroke. This late-season surge elevated him to 20th place on the season's final money list. In addition, he finished 31st in the FedEx cup standings after narrowly missing out on a place in the Tour Championship by one position.

In 2011 Haas won the season-ending Tour Championship at East Lake Golf Club, defeating Hunter Mahan in a sudden death playoff at the third extra hole. At the second playoff hole, Haas played an exceptional pitch from the bank of the water hazard to save par and extend the playoff. The victory propelled Haas to 2011 FedEx Cup title and the $10 million prize. Haas was ranked seventh on the final 2011 PGA Tour money list (the FedEx Cup money does not count toward that total).

Haas was one of U.S. team captain, Fred Couples', two picks for the 2011 Presidents Cup team, along with Tiger Woods.  The USA went on to retain the cup, and Haas contributed 1.5 points to the team, with an overall record of 1-3-1 for the week.

Haas won for the fourth time on the PGA Tour in February 2012 at the Northern Trust Open at Riviera Country Club. He came from two strokes back on the final day to hold the clubhouse lead and force both Phil Mickelson and Keegan Bradley to hole lengthy birdie putts on the last hole to ensure a playoff. All three players then parred the 18th, the first playoff hole, and continued to the driveable par-4 10th hole. Haas squirted his drive out to the left to leave a tricky pitch, while Mickelson found the rough and Bradley the bunker on the right. Haas decided to pitch out to the middle of the green, as both Mickelson and Bradley could not find the green on their second shots. Haas then holed a 43-foot birdie putt, and when neither Mickelson nor Bradley could match him, his victory was ensured.

In June 2013 Haas claimed his fifth PGA Tour title with a win at the AT&T National at Congressional Country Club. He won by three strokes over Roberto Castro after shooting a closing 66, including six birdies and one bogey. He had begun the final round in a four-way tie for the lead. Haas is now one of four players who have won PGA Tour events in each of the last four seasons, joining Dustin Johnson, Phil Mickelson and Justin Rose.

In April 2014 Haas led the Masters after an opening round of 68. However, he shot a second round six-over-par 78 to fall down the leaderboard. Over the weekend he finished with rounds of 74-70 to end T20th.

In January 2015, Haas won for the sixth time on the PGA Tour, at the Humana Challenge. He shot a final round 67 for a total of 22-under-par and one stroke victory over five other players. This was the second time that Haas had won the Humana Challenge in his career, having previously won in 2010 (as the Bob Hope Classic). Haas said afterwards that the victory came as a surprise to himself after only recently returning from a fractured wrist injury that hampered him throughout 2014.  Haas was selected to his third Presidents Cup in 2015, becoming the first American to play in three Presidents Cups without being chosen for the Ryder Cup.

Haas played the 2018-19 season out of the 126-150 category after an injury kept him off the course for part of the previous season and he did not earn enough to retain full Tour privileges, the first time in his career that Haas did have full status on the PGA Tour.

Personal life
Haas comes from a distinguished family of golfers. His father is nine-time PGA Tour winner, Jay Haas. His brother, Jay Haas Jr., and uncle, Jerry Haas, are former PGA Tour players. He is a great nephew of 1968 Masters Tournament winner, Bob Goalby.

Haas and his father won the CVS Caremark Charity Classic in 2004, an unofficial PGA Tour event.

On February 13, 2018, Haas was involved in an automobile accident in Pacific Palisades, California in which the driver, Mark Gibello, was pronounced dead. The following day, Haas was released from the hospital after treatment for an injury from the accident and released a statement saying that he would withdraw from the ongoing Genesis Open.

Amateur wins
2002 Players Amateur

Professional wins (7)

PGA Tour wins (6)

PGA Tour playoff record (2–3)

Other wins (1)

Other playoff record (0–1)

Results in major championships

CUT = missed the half-way cut
"T" = tied

Summary

Most consecutive cuts made – 7 (2015 PGA – 2017 U.S. Open)
Longest streak of top-10s – 1 (twice)

Results in The Players Championship

CUT = missed the halfway cut
"T" indicates a tie for a place

Results in World Golf Championships
Results not in chronological order before 2015.

QF, R16, R32, R64 = Round in which player lost in match play
"T" = Tied

U.S. national team appearances
Amateur
Palmer Cup: 2002 (winners), 2003
Walker Cup: 2003

Professional
Presidents Cup: 2011 (winners), 2013 (winners), 2015 (winners)

See also
2005 PGA Tour Qualifying School graduates

References

External links

American male golfers
Wake Forest Demon Deacons men's golfers
PGA Tour golfers
Golfers from Charlotte, North Carolina
Golfers from South Carolina
People from Greer, South Carolina
Sportspeople from Greenville, South Carolina
1982 births
Living people